Sibel Arslan (born 23 June 1980 in Erzincan, Turkey) is a Swiss lawyer and politician of the party BastA! (Green Party).

Early life and education 
Sibel Arslan is of Kurdish origin, and arrived in Switzerland in 1991 with her mother and two brothers. Her father had already arrived six years previously as a refugee. The family settled in Basel. In 2002, she graduated from the Gymnasium Bäumlihof in Basel. She studied law at the University of Basel and graduated in 2011.

Along with her brother, Arslan managed the shisha bar 'Susam' in Barfüsserplatz from 2006 to 2007. Arslan has been working as a legal advisor to the Basel Gewerkschaftsbund since 2012. From 2013 to 2015 she was a career adviser at the Office for Counseling and Adult Protection of the Canton of Basel-Stadt. Since March 2015 she has worked as a lawyer in the General Secretariat of the Security Directorate of the Canton of Basel-Landschaft.

Political career 
Arslan joined BastA! in 2004, a leftist ecological party in the canton of Basel-Stadt. BastA is a member of the Green Party of Switzerland. From 2005 to 2016 she sat in the Grand Council of Basel-Stadt. In 2007, she became a member of the Justice, Safety and Sports Commission and, from 2013, the Pardon Commission.  

At the end of 2014 the Cantonal Regierungsrat (Executive Councilor) of Basel Landschaft, Security Director Isaac Reber revoked an agreed appointment of Arslan as head of the cantonal penal sanctions and measures committee, after the Basler Zeitung had led a campaign against her. The newspaper had alleged lack of qualifications and debts of about 60,000 Swiss francs.  These claims covered three agreements that Arslan had also mentioned in the application process. The fact that these claims were recorded in the debt collection register "was not clarified in all media reports". At the time of Arslan's application, only a residual debt of CHF 5,000 had to be paid. This happened within a short time.

Arslan was elected to the National Council in the 2015 Swiss federal election. On 30 November 2015 she took the oath of office. The ceremony was held in Bern. In Parliament she joined the fraction of the Green Party of Switzerland and is a member of the Foreign Policy Commission and the Legal Commission. In October 2019 she was re-elected to the National Council.

Political positions 
She is a defender of women rights and was shortly detained after she participated in the Swiss Women's Strike 2020 and supports the same-sex marriages. Besides, she is a member of the Swiss Association of Foreign Policy.

Personal life 
In 2004 she became a Swiss citizen and is a Turkish and Swiss dual citizen.

References

External links 

 
 Website Sibel Arslan
 

1980 births
Living people
Swiss Muslims
Green Party of Switzerland politicians
Turkish emigrants to Switzerland
Members of the National Council (Switzerland)
Kurdish lawyers
Kurdish women lawyers
People from Erzincan
Women members of the National Council (Switzerland)
Politicians from Basel-Stadt
Swiss women lawyers
21st-century Swiss women politicians
21st-century Swiss politicians
21st-century Swiss lawyers
Kurdish politicians
21st-century women lawyers
21st-century Kurdish women politicians